Piem (cartoonist) (1923 – 2020), French cartoonist
 Piem, a type of mnemonic technique